A113 (sometimes A-113, A-1-13, A1-13 or A11-3) is an inside joke and Easter egg in media developed by alumni of California Institute of the Arts, referring to the classroom used by graphic design and character animation students.

History
Students who have used the classroom include John Lasseter, Tim Burton, Michael Peraza, and Brad Bird.  It has appeared in other Disney movies and almost every Pixar movie.

Brad Bird first used it for a license plate number in the  "Family Dog" episode of Amazing Stories: "I put it into every single one of my films, including my Simpsons episodes—it's sort of my version of caricaturist Al Hirschfeld's 'Nina'." It appears in South Park, Aqua Teen Hunger Force and the SPA Studios animated film Klaus (2019). The first Disney movie Bird used it in was The Brave Little Toaster (1987), in which he was an animator. It can be seen as The Master's apartment address when Toaster and his friends knock on the door.

See also
 List of Pixar film references
 List of filmmaker's signatures
 42 – The Answer to the Ultimate Question of Life, the Universe, and Everything, first used by Douglas Adams in The Hitchhiker's Guide to the Galaxy, often used as an in-joke.
 Goroawase, a common Japanese language stylistic recourse in which numerical codes representing words are created with syllables that can be used to pronounce each numeral.

References

Bibliography

External links

In-jokes
Individual rooms
California Institute of the Arts
Vehicle registration plates of the United States
Easter egg (media)